Issiaga Sylla (born 1 January 1994) is a Guinean professional footballer who plays as a left-back for  club Montpellier and the Guinea national team.

Club career
Sylla was born in Conakry, Guinea. He made his debut for Toulouse on 4 May 2013, starting as a left midfielder in a 4–2 win over Lille.

Sylla was loaned out to promoted side Gazélec Ajaccio for the 2015–16 Ligue 1 season.

On 31 January 2023, Sylla signed for Ligue 1 club Montpellier.

International career
Sylla made his international debut for the Guinea national team at 7 September 2011 against Venezuela. He played with the national team in 2015 Africa Cup of Nations, where the team reached the quarter-finals.

Career statistics

International

Scores and results list Guinea's goal tally first, score column indicates score after each Sylla goal.

Honours 
Horoya AC

 Guinée Championnat National: 2011–12

Toulouse

 Ligue 2: 2021–22

References

External links
 

1994 births
Living people
Susu people
Association football fullbacks
Sportspeople from Conakry
Guinean footballers
Guinea international footballers
2015 Africa Cup of Nations players
2019 Africa Cup of Nations players
2021 Africa Cup of Nations players
Championnat National 3 players
Ligue 1 players
Championnat National 2 players
Ligue 2 players
Horoya AC players
Toulouse FC players
Gazélec Ajaccio players
RC Lens players
Montpellier HSC players
Guinean expatriate footballers
Guinean expatriate sportspeople in France
Expatriate footballers in France